The third edition of the Johan Cruyff Shield was held on 16 August 1998 between Ajax, who had won both the 1997–98 Eredivisie and the 1997–98 KNVB Cup, and PSV Eindhoven, who had finished as runners-up in the 1997–98 Eredivisie (and, coincidentally, also in the 1997–98 KNVB Cup). PSV won the match 2–0.

Match

Details

References 

1998
Johan Cruijff-schaal
J
J
Johan Cruyff Shield